Gillian Galan (born 7 August 1991) is a French rugby union player. His position is Number 8 and he played for Lyon in the Top 14.

References

External links
 Stade Toulousain profile

1991 births
Living people
French rugby union players
People from Montauban
Stade Toulousain players
Rugby union number eights
Sportspeople from Tarn-et-Garonne
Lyon OU players